The Good Wife is a South Korean television series starring Jeon Do-yeon, Yoo Ji-tae and Yoon Kye-sang. It is a Korean drama remake of the American television series of the same title which aired on CBS from 2009 to 2016. It replaced Dear My Friends and aired on the cable network tvN every Fridays and Saturdays at 20:30 (KST) for 16 episodes from July 8 to August 27, 2016.

Cast

Main
 Jeon Do-yeon as Kim Hye-kyung – newly hired lawyer.
 Yoo Ji-tae as Lee Tae-joon – prosecutor, Hye-kyung's husband.
 Yoon Kye-sang as Seo Joong-won – Law firm's co-managing partner (sharing position with his older sister Seo Myung-hee), and friend of Hye-kyung.

MJ Law firm
 Kim Seo-hyung as Seo Myung-hee – Law firm's co-managing partner (sharing position with her younger brother Seo Joong-won).
 Nana as Kim Dan – Law firm's investigator, Hye-kyung's colleague.
 Lee Won-keun as Lee Joon-ho – newly hired lawyer, Hye-kyung's rival.
  as David Lee – divorce lawyer, Hye-kyung's colleague.

People around Lee Tae-joon
 Kim Tae-woo as Choi Sang-il – deputy inspector of Seyang District Prosecutors Office, Tae-joon's opponent.
 Jeon Seok-ho as Park Do-seop – inspector of Seyang District Prosecutors Office, Sang-il's right arm.
 Tae In-ho as Oh Joo-hwan – Tae-joon's lawyer.

Kim Hye-kyung's family
 Sung Yu-bin as Lee Ji-hoon – Hye-kyung's son.
 Park Si-eun as Lee Seo-yeon – Hye-kyung's daughter.
 Yoon Hyun-min as Kim Sae-byuk - Hye Kyung's younger brother (ep. 13).

Extended cast

 Choi Byung-mo as Lee Jong-in – the judge in charge of Lee Tae-joon's case and Kim In-young's case
 Yoon Joo-sang as Seo Jae-moon – Joong-won's father
  as Amber
 Bae Hae-sun as Shim Eun-sook – Sang-il's wife
 Go Jun as Jo Gook-hyun – steel development's representative, Lee Tae-joon's bribery related person
  as Kang Seok-beom – Gook-hyun's driver
 Park Ah-in as Lee Yeon-joo – lawyer
 Oh Yeon-ah as Lee Soo-yeon – lawyer
 Gong Sang-ah as Kim In-young – Park Dong-hyun's wife, suspect of Park Dong-hyun's murder case
 Jung Ji-ho
  as apartment security, witness of Park Dong-hyun's murder case
 Lee Young-shil as apartment's cleaning lady
 Na Da-woon
 Park Joo-hee as Do Han-na
 Song Yoo-hyun
 Geum Seo-yeon as Sevi – In-young's daughter
  as Jang Dae-seok – Mooil Group lawyer
 Uhm Hyun-kyung as Lee Eun-joo – rape victim
  as Kim Sang-man – character accompanied by Lee Eun-joo
  as Jung Han-wook – 3rd generation chaebeol, suspect of Lee Eun-joo's rape case
  as talk show's political commentator
  as talk show host
  as sex shop madame
  as Kim Dan's friend at prosecutor's office
 Kang Hee
  as the judge in charge of Lee Eun-joo's rape case
 
 
 Lee Gi-seop as Jang Dae-seok's junior, witness of Lee Eun-joo's rape case
 Park Seon-im as Hana – Seo Joong-won's meeting woman
 Moon Ah-ram as Choi Yoon-jin – hotel staff
  as Kim Ye-ji – Eun-joo's friend
 Kang Jeong-goo
 Kim Ji-eun as Lee Hyo-jin
  as detective who tried to arrest Jung Han-wook
 Lee Hyun-bae as the judge in charge of Seo Jae-moon's case
  as traffic police
 Lee Yoon-sang as KJ Products's finance director
 Park Chul-min
 Kim Kwang-tae
  as Cheol-goo
 Jung Seon-ah
 Im Pyung-soon
  as Sang-il's divorce lawyer
 Do Yool-gok
 Kim Bong-soo as Sai Yoichi
 Park Joo-yong
 Yoon Da-gyeong as Dong-hyun's mother
  as Jae-yeol's mother
 Jung Jae-min as Jung Jae-yeol
 Jung In-wook
 Kang Shin-goo
 Seo Dong-gap
 Ryu Chang-woo
 Jang In-ho
 Kim Jae-heum
 Lee Eun-shil
 Sung Hyun-mi
 Kim Bo-ri
 Han Dae-ryong
  as Kim Hee-ae – the judge in charge of Lee Ho-jin's dignity-related case
 Na Cheol as Na Joong-gi – Lee Hyo-jin's common-law relationship husband
  as Lee Hyo-jin's older brother
  as Woo-sung – Lee Hyo-jin's doctor, Joong-won's friend, witness
 Hong Seo-joon as gynecologist – Lee Hyo-jin's related plaintiff witnesses
  as Lee Hyo-jin's adult relative
 Kim Tae-rang
 Kim Mi-hye as Kim Mi-hye – CNB News reporter
 Kim Jae-cheol
 Kwon Gi-joo
 Kang Sung-cheol as hospital's security team member
 Kang Chan-yang
 Choi Nam-wook
 Seo Hyun-woo as Baek Min-hyuk – inspector
 
 Seo Hyun-chul as Son Byung-ho – presiding judge, the judge in charge of Lee Tae-joon's case
 Kim Tae-hwan
 Jung Jong-woo
 Choi Hyun-jeong
 Shin Dong-eun
 
 Jung Soo-in
 Sung Nak-kyung
 
  as judge
 Park Ji-a as medical staff
 
 Kim Min-kwang
 
 Im Jae-geun
 Go Ah-chim
 Baek Joon-hyuk
  as Kim Woo-yeol – Kim Dan's colleague at prosecutor's office
  as Ji-eun – Park Jeong-jin's wife
 Kang Ki-dong as Jung Shi-yeon's boyfriend
  as Park Jeong-jin
 Jang Do-yoon
 Kim Bo-hyun as Jung Shi-yeon
 Jo Hye-jin
 Jung Ye-ji as Supporting
 Jin Ki-joo as Song Hee-soo
 Jang Joon-ho as MJ Law firm's fired lawyer
 
 Park Ik-joon
 Kim Hyung-gi
 Kim Do-hae
 Kang Min-seo
 Min Ye-ji
 Park Joo-hee as Do Han-na
 Seo Byung-deok
 
 Lee Sang-hwa
 Choi Seung-yoon
 Lee Jong-eun
 Kim Joon-won
 Park Seon-young
 Woo Hye-young
 Ha Jin
 Lee Shi-on
 
 Choi Myung-gil

Special appearance
 Park Jung-soo as Oh Jeong-im – Lee Tae-joon's mother.
 Yoo Jae-myung as Son Dong-ho – Lawyer.

Ratings
In this table,  represent the lowest ratings and  represent the highest ratings.

Original soundtrack

Part 1

Part 2

Part 3

Production
The series was directed by Lee Jung-hyo whose prior work includes I Need Romance and Witch's Romance.

Remake
This series is remade in Vietnam as Hành trình công lý, aired on government-owned VTV3 in October, 10th, 2022.

Awards and nominations

Notes

References

External links

The Good Wife at Daum 
The Good Wife at Naver Movies 

TVN (South Korean TV channel) television dramas
Korean-language television shows
South Korean television series based on American television series
2016 South Korean television series debuts
2016 South Korean television series endings
The Good Wife
South Korean legal television series
South Korean political television series
Television series by Studio Dragon